Epinotia algeriensis is a species of moth in the family Tortricidae. It is found in Algeria. The larvae feed on Cedrus atlantica.

References

Moths described in 1990
Eucosmini